Dylan Rhodes O'Brien (born August 26, 1991) is an American actor. His first major role was Stiles Stilinski on the MTV supernatural drama Teen Wolf (2011–2017), where he was a series regular during all six seasons. He achieved further prominence for his lead role of Thomas in the Maze Runner science fiction film trilogy (2014–2018), which led to more film appearances. He played Deepwater Horizon explosion survivor Caleb Holloway in the disaster film Deepwater Horizon (2016), fictional counterterrorist Mitch Rapp in the action thriller American Assassin (2017), and title character in the Transformers installment Bumblebee (2018). He also played the lead in the adventure film Love and Monsters (2020).

Early life
O'Brien was born in New York City, the son of Lisa (née Rhodes), a former actress who ran an acting school, and Patrick O'Brien, a camera operator. He grew up in Springfield Township, New Jersey, until the age of twelve, when he and his family moved to Hermosa Beach, California. He is of Irish, Italian, English, and Spanish descent. After graduating from Mira Costa High School in 2009, he considered pursuing sports broadcasting and possibly working for the New York Mets.

At 14, O'Brien began posting original videos onto his YouTube channel. In his senior high school year, a local producer and director approached him about working for a web series. While working on the series, O'Brien met an actor who connected him with a manager. O'Brien subsequently changed his plans to attend Syracuse University as a sports broadcasting major, to pursue acting.

Career
Before beginning his acting career, O'Brien produced, directed and starred in a number of short comedy films which he released through his personal YouTube channel. He was also the drummer for the independent rock band Slow Kids at Play.

O'Brien's acting break came when he landed one of the main roles in MTV's Teen Wolf, a series loosely based on  the 1985 film. He was intended to play Scott, but after reading the script, he wanted to audition for the part of Stiles instead. After four auditions, he was cast, and started playing the role in 2010.

In 2011, O'Brien was introduced to audiences in the entirely improvised independent comedy film High Road. The next year, he starred in the romantic comedy The First Time.

In 2013, while on hiatus from Teen Wolf, he co-starred in the comedy film The Internship; and that summer, filmed The Maze Runner (2014), playing the lead role of Thomas. Yahoo! Movies named him as one of the 15 Breakout Stars to Watch for in 2014. He reprised the role of Thomas in Maze Runner: The Scorch Trials, released on September 18, 2015.

In March 2016, O'Brien was seriously injured on set while filming a stunt for Maze Runner: The Death Cure. He was in a harness on top of a moving vehicle when he was unexpectedly pulled off the vehicle and hit by another vehicle. His injuries included facial fractures, a concussion, and brain trauma. He later said that the accident "'broke most of the right side'" of his face; he underwent reconstructive facial surgery. After months of recovery, he eventually began filming other projects, and his March 2017 return to The Death Cure set marked his complete return to health. The film premiered January 26, 2018.

In 2016, he appeared in the disaster thriller-drama Deepwater Horizon, based on the 2010 Deepwater Horizon explosion. He starred in 2017's American Assassin, an action-thriller where he played titular character Mitch Rapp; and voiced the CGI title character in the Transformers spin-off film Bumblebee in 2018.

In 2019, he guest-starred in the comedy sci-fi anthology series Weird City. In 2020, he starred in the mystery thriller Flashback (filmed in 2018), and the post-apocalyptic road trip film Love and Monsters.

In February 2021, he was cast in The Outfit, for which filming finished in April 2021. In August 2021, he was cast in Not Okay, for which filming finished in September 2021. Also in August, he was cast in The Vanishings at Caddo Lake, originally reported by Discussing Film and later confirmed by Deadline Hollywood in October 2021. In October 2021, it was announced he would guest star in season 11 of Curb Your Enthusiasm. On November 12, 2021, O'Brien starred opposite Sadie Sink in Taylor Swift's short film All Too Well. He was credited as a drummer on the track "Snow on the Beach" from Swift's tenth studio album, Midnights (2022).

Filmography

Film

Television

Awards and nominations

References

External links
 
 

1991 births
Living people
21st-century American male actors
American male film actors
American male television actors
Male actors from Los Angeles County, California
Male actors from New Jersey
Male actors from New York City
People from Hermosa Beach, California
People from Springfield Township, Union County, New Jersey
Mira Costa High School alumni